Admiral Sir Edward Gennys Fanshawe,  (27 November 1814 – 21 October 1906) was a Royal Navy officer who went on to be Commander-in-Chief, Portsmouth. He was a gifted amateur artist, with much of his work in the National Maritime Museum, London.

Naval career
Born the eldest surviving son of General Sir Edward Fanshawe, and the nephew of Admiral Sir Arthur Fanshawe, Fanshawe was educated at the Royal Naval Academy, Portsmouth where he came second from the top in a very talented year and was commended for both his artistic and writing ability. Fanshawe joined the Royal Navy in 1828. During the Oriental Crisis of 1840 he took part in the capture of Acre.

Later he commanded ,  and then . He suffered some health problems from the 1850s, which curtailed his Mediterranean command of HMS Centurion.

He was made Superintendent of Chatham Dockyard in 1861, Third Naval Lord in 1865 and Superintendent of Malta Dockyard in 1868.
He went on to be Commander-in-Chief, North American Station in 1870, Admiral President of the Royal Naval College, Greenwich in 1875 and Commander-in-Chief, Portsmouth in 1878. He retired in 1879.
   
From the early 1850s he and his family lived at Rutland Gate in London. He later moved to 63 Eaton Square and finally to 75 Cromwell Road in Kensington, where he died on Trafalgar Day 1906.

Family
Fanshawe's marriage to Jane Cardwell took place in early 1843; she was the sister of Edward (later Lord) Cardwell, a notable politician and, as Secretary of State for War under William Gladstone in the 1860s, instigator of the 'Cardwell Reforms' of the British Army.

They had four sons and a daughter, including:
 Lieutenant-Colonel Edward Cardwell Fanshawe, of the Royal Engineers, who married in 1900 Alice Drew, daughter of Colonel George Drew, CB.
 Admiral of the Fleet Sir Arthur Dalrymple Fanshawe (1847–1936), whose son Guy Dalrymple Fanshawe also became a Royal Naval Captain.
 Alice Fanshawe

Further reading
 Admiral Sir Edward Gennys Fanshawe GCB, published 1904, edited by Alice Fanshawe and illustrated with Edward Fanshawe's own drawings
 Albums of over 100 drawings covering his Pacific voyage in the Daphne and the other later activities, mainly in the Baltic Sea and the Mediterranean with some of his holiday drawings in Scotland and Switzerland from 1843 to 1883, held by the National Maritime Museum

See also

References

|-

|-

|-

|-

1814 births
1906 deaths
Admiral presidents of the Royal Naval College, Greenwich
Knights Grand Cross of the Order of the Bath
Royal Navy admirals
Royal Navy personnel of the Crimean War
Military personnel from Plymouth, Devon
Lords of the Admiralty
Fanshawe family
Royal Navy personnel of the Egyptian–Ottoman War (1839–1841)